PhreakNIC is an annual hacker and technology convention held in Nashville, Tennessee. It is organized by the Nashville 2600 Organization and draws upon resources from  SouthEastern 2600 (se2600).  The Nashville Linux User Group was closely tied with PhreakNIC for the first 10 years, but is no longer an active participant in the planning.  First held in 1997, PhreakNIC continues to be a long-time favorite among hackers, security experts and technology enthusiasts. PhreakNIC currently holds claim as the oldest regional hacker con and is one of the few hacker cons run by a 501(c)(3) tax-free charity. The conference attracts about 350 attendees.

PhreakNIC consists of presentations on a variety of technical subjects, sometimes related to a conference theme. There is also a film room showing anime and technology-related videos from popular culture. The Nashville Linux Users Group held a Linux Installfest from PhreakNIC 3 through PhreakNIC X.

PhreakNIC is attended by hackers and other technology enthusiasts from across the United States, although, as a regional conference, most of its attendees come from a two-state radius around Tennessee, including groups from Missouri, Ohio, Washington, DC, Georgia, Kentucky, and Alabama.

As PhreakNIC has been held in downtown Nashville, near the Tennessee Titans stadium, the exact date for PhreakNIC was previously not announced each year until the NFL released its schedule in April.  PhreakNIC is intentionally scheduled not to coincide with a Titans home game, to give conference organizers full reign over the venue.  However, PhreakNIC is typically held around the time of Halloween.

Past locations
 Drury Inn at I-24 and Harding Place
 PhreakNIC 2
 PhreakNIC 3: October 29–31, 1999
 Days Inn on Briley Pkwy at the airport
 PhreakNIC 4: November 3–5, 2000
PhreakNIC 5: November 2–4, 2001
 Ramada Inn downtown
PhreakNIC 6: November 1–3, 2002
 Days Inn at the Stadium
PhreakNIC 7: October 24–26, 2003
PhreakNIC 8: October 22–24, 2004
PhreakNIC 9: October 21–23, 2005
PhreakNIC 10: October 20–22, 2006
PhreakNIC 11: October 19–21, 2007
PhreakNIC 12: October 24–26, 2008
PhreakNIC 13: October 30–31, 2009
PhreakNIC 14: October 15–17, 2010
PhreakNIC 15: November 4–6, 2011
 Clarion Inn and Suites, Murfreesboro, TN
PhreakNIC 16: November 9–11, 2012
 PhreakNIC 17: September 20–22, 2013
 Millennium Maxwell House Hotel, Nashville, TN
 PhreakNIC 18: October 30 - November 2, 2014
 Clarion Inn and Suites, Murfreesboro, TN
 PhreakNIC 19: November 6–7, 2015
 PhreakNIC 20: November 4–6, 2016
 PhreakNIC 21: November 3-5, 2017
 PhreakNIC 22: October 19-20, 2018
 PhreakNIC 23: November 8-10, 2019

See also
 DEF CON
 Hackers on Planet Earth
 Notacon
 Shmoocon
 CarolinaCon

References

External links
 PhreakNIC website
 Nashville 2600
 Nashville Linux Users Group
 SouthEastern 2600
 PhreakNIC Video Archives
 Official PhreakNIC YouTube Channel

Hacker conventions